Stevie Kathleen Ryan (June 2, 1984 – July 1, 2017) was an American YouTube personality, actress and comedian. She was known for her YouTube videos and starring in the VH1 series Stevie TV.

Ryan was born June 2, 1984, in Riverside, California. At the age of two, Ryan and her family relocated to Victorville, where her parents operated a trucking business. In 2002, she graduated from Silverado High School.

At the age of 19, Ryan made the move to Los Angeles to pursue a career in the entertainment industry. Throughout 2006 and 2007, Ryan booked various commercial projects while also filming, editing, and acting in videos which she posted online.

Ryan collaborated with New Wave Entertainment in 2010 on the sketch comedy show Stevie TV, which parodied famous pop culture personalities and phenomena. It was picked up by VH1. It was cancelled after the second season.

Ryan was found dead in her home due to an apparent suicide by hanging on July 1, 2017, at the age of 33.

Filmography

Film

Television

References

External links 
 It Should Happen To You: The Anxieties of YouTube Fame (The New Yorker)

1984 births
2017 deaths
Actresses from California
21st-century American actresses
American YouTubers
Female suicides
People from Riverside, California
People from Victorville, California
Suicides by hanging in California
2017 suicides